Safiabad (also Romanized as Şafīābād) is a village in Faragheh Rural District, in the Central District of Abarkuh County, Yazd Province, Iran. At the 2006 census, its population was 552, in 163 families.

References 

Populated places in Abarkuh County